This is an index of the characters of the novels, short stories and anime adaptations for Crest of the Stars, Banner of the Stars and Seikai no Danshō. In each entry, the first version of the name is from Tokyopop's licensed English translations of the manga and novels. In Bandai's licensed English version of the anime, the names are similar to Tokyopop's versions but not identical.

Main protagonists 

 Lafiel is a strong-willed Abh princess. She is from the Clyuve Royal Family, in itself a member of the Abriel Imperial Family. As a granddaughter of the current Abh Empress Ramaj, she is in the line of succession to the throne. Despite being a princess, she rarely acts like one and hates being treated as one. One of the reasons Lafiel befriends Jinto is because Jinto neither recognizes her as a princess nor treats her as one when they first meet. Their relationship is so close that she freely allows him to use her real name of Lafiel when addressing her, something that is very uncommon when addressing those of nobility or royalty. She acts much older than her age (at her introduction in Crest of the Stars, she is 16 years old) and can, in most cases, logically think her way out of a situation. However, her headstrong nature sometimes clouds her judgment and can lead her to become impulsive. She is a very good shot and although she sometimes doubts herself, she proves to be a worthy ship captain (deca-commander) in Banner of the Stars. She shows little emotion throughout Crest of the Stars, but as time goes by became a very close friend with Jinto through Banner of the Stars. This is especially true in later installments, where she more frequently questions how their friendship will last due to the relative shortness of Jinto's lifespan.

 Born Jinto Lin on planet Martine of the Hyde Star System, he is the son of Rock Lin, a politician who became president of the Hyde Star System. His mother was a mining engineer, who died in a mine accident soon after his birth. Because his father was busy with political activities, Jinto was brought up by his father's secretary, Teal Clint. When the Abh Empire invaded Hyde stellar system, his father surrendered the system in exchange for several concessions including selecting the territorial lord from amongst the people of Martine. As a result, Jinto rose to the ranks of Abh nobility along with his father. Growing up in a planet where he was considered the son of a traitor has not been easy for him. Even as he grew older, he would flinch at unfamiliar gestures. Jinto is eventually sent to the Planet Delktou to learn Baronh and Abh culture from Imperial citizens. Approximately seven years later, he leaves Delktou for a military college in Lakfakalle, the capital of the Abh Empire, to continue his education. It is in the spaceport of Delktou that he meets Lafiel who served as his escort and shuttle pilot from the spaceport to the patrolship Gosroth. The novels, and the anime, are a chronicle of the evolving personalities of the two, and their changing relationship with each other. He signs his name "Jint Linn".

Abh 
 Rock Lin
 Jinto's father. His formal name in Baronh was Linn ssynec Rocr Dreuc Haïder Roch. He was the head of government of the Hyde stellar system (Haïdec in Baronh) during the invasion of the Abh Empire. Believing his own ideas more valuable than the rights of the people of Martine, Rock Lin decides to surrender the stellar system but stipulated that the territorial lord of Hyde should be chosen from amongst the people of Martine. The leader of the invading forces agreed to this however this meant that an election could not be held making Rock, as the current leader of Martine, the natural choice to become its territorial lord. Because of the size of his domain, he is accepted into the Abh aristocracy as a great lord and conferred with the princely rank of Dreuc, equivalent to Count. His actions were interpreted by the people of Martine as treason. After the Four Nations Alliance took the planet from the Abh Empire, he was executed by the Hyde parliament despite the best efforts of his old friend Teal Clint, the new President.

 Abriel Nei Lamsar Larth Balkei Dusanyu
 The current Dusanyu, or Crown Prince, of the Abh Empire of Mankind, the Baronh name of which is Frybar Gloer Gor Bari (Frybarec Gloer Gor Bari), Also the Commander-in-Chief of the Abh Armed Forces, who personally led the invasion of the Hyde star system. 

 Lexshue Wef-Robell Plakia
 The captain of the Gosroth, she is every bit as smart, beautiful, dedicated and stubborn as Lafiel, but older and wiser. Judging from her name, Lexshue's rank in the Abh social hierarchy is that of a reucec (knight or dame). She is allegedly Lafiel's mother, according to Lafiel herself. 

 Abriel Nei Debrusc Larth Kryb Debeus
 Lafiel's father, the King of Kryv and a son of the current reigning empress. He is somewhat impulsive and curious and is not above practical jokes. He once pranked his daughter into believing that half of her genes came from their pet cat.

 Abriel Nei Debrusc Duhiel
 Lafiel's younger brother, who is fifteen and in his first year at the Kenle. He was raised in the capital by his father and shown to feel inferior to his sister, who was already a Bene Rodail (officer-in-training) at his age.

 Atosryua Syun-Atos Lyuf Febdash Klowal
 The third Baron of Febdash, an obscure star system where Jinto and Lafiel made a stopover en route to Safugnoff (Sfagnaumh). He had an inferiority complex due to his clan's origins and brief history, causing him to confine and isolate his own father. He tried to abduct Lafiel and imprison Jinto, which brought dire consequences onto himself. 

 Atosryua Syun-Atos Lyuf Raika Febdash Srguf
 The second Baron of Febdash and father of Klowal and Loïc. Srguf's mother was the first Baroness, who gained distinction by rising through the Imperial Star Force, or Labule (Laburec). Due to his being a genetic "grounder," his own son despised him resulting in confinement and isolation. He eventually befriended Jinto and aided Lafiel in "punishing" Klowal. His daughter, Loïc eventually became the Baroness of Febdash and a commanding officer to Lafiel and Jinto.

 Atosryac Syun-Atos Lyuf Febdash Klowal Loïc
 The fourth Baron of Febdash, Loïc served the Star Forces and attained the rank of Hecto-Commander, in command of a squadron of assault ships that included Lafiel's. Unlike her brother Klowal she had no desire to be in character of their family's territory and was unhappy to receive the duty. She got along well with her father and held no ill-will towards grounders unlike her brother, nor did she hold a grudge to Jinto and Lafiel for their role in what happened to Klowal, recognizing the events as a result of his actions. Loïc got along well and was respected by her subordinates, though she had some hesitance in contacting Lafiel on non-military matters due to her high noble rank, preferring to go through Jinto instead, and was a highly able commander.

 Abriel Nei Debrusc Spunej Ramaj
 The current reigning empress of the Abh Empire, she is also Lafiel's grandmother. She also holds the title "Dreuc Ablïarser" (Countess of Ablïarsec; Ablïarsec is also the name of the stellar system where Lakfakalle (Lacmhacarh), the imperial capital, is located). All interstellar ships belong to the crown which are then leased out to the merchants of the empire. 

 Trife Boli Yuvdale Remsale
 Despite verging on excessive caution, he is nonetheless one of the most able tacticians in the Labule. He puts every aspect and factor under consideration, frequently asking his subordinates' opinions and assessments before starting an operation. He is also one of the least loved officers. 

 Spoor Aron Sekpadao Letopanyu Peneju
 This red-eyed officer from the Spoor clan is one of the most eccentric in the Labule, which does not change the fact that she is one of its most able admirals. Though complaining of boredom most of the time, she suddenly springs into action when needed. One of her favorite pastimes is mercilessly teasing Kaselia, her chief of staff. The Spoor family prides itself of being a close kin to the Abriel Imperial Family and the Spoor family consists of over five hundred titled members. As the Grand Duchess, she is heir to the Spoor legacy. 

 Kufadis
 Spoor's lieutenant, who tries to restrain some of the more whimsical actions of his commanding officer. He is generally seen secretly moaning and groaning over his lot as Spoor's subordinate. 

 Aicryac Üémh Tlyzr Naurh
 Basrogrh (Basroil) pilot who shows an interest in Jinto.

 Basrogrh first navigator

Samsonn Borgh Tiruser Tirusec
 Basrogrh mechanic, a non-genetic Abh like Jinto who eventually becomes his first vassal.

"Terrestrials"/Four Nations Alliance 

 Teal Clint
 Rock Linn's best friend and clerk before the Abh invasion of the Hyde star system. He also became Jinto's foster father after Jinto's mother died and Rock Linn became too busy in politics to raise his own son. After Rock Linn's act of "high treason," Teal Clint became head of the anti-Abh resistance. When the Four Nations Alliance of the United Mankind and its allies helped the Hyde star system free itself from the Abh Empire, Teal Clint became the new President and reluctantly executed Rock Linn. 

 Dorin Ku
 One of Jinto's friends during his early education on the planet Delktou. He was a fan of the game "minchiu" (minteau), a cross between soccer and roller derby, and played on the same local team as Jinto. He was the only person who came to say goodbye at the spaceport when Jinto was departing for the military academy at Lakfakalle. 

 Seelnay
 A vassal of the Barony of Febdash who helped Jinto and Lafiel to escape from the clutches of Klowal. She later started her own ship-repair business with other former Febdash vassals. 

 Inspector Entryua
 Chief of the Police Department of Lune Biga, a city on Planet Clasbul in the Sufugnoff star system. He was forced to cooperate with the invading forces of the United Mankind to search for Jinto and Lafiel. 

 Lt. Kyte
 An Alliance military police officer from the United Mankind who led the search for Jinto and Lafiel in Sufugnoff. He belonged to the Silejia people who practiced genetic anti-aging manipulation before their annexation by the United Mankind; despite looking like a young man in his twenties, he is in reality around fifty years old. Because the United Mankind bans genetic manipulation, he is therefore much despised by most citizens of the United Mankind and is prevented from rising amongst the ranks of the military. This is one of the causes of his bitter hatred against the Abhs. He forced Entryua to accompany him and use local police resources in seeking for the Abh pair. 

 Marca
 The head of an underground anti-empirialist (though not necessarily "anti-Abh") group of Clasbul seeking independence to run their own shipping, transportation, and trade. She acts as a hotel chambermaid and tries to kidnap Jinto and Lafiel to attain her group's goals. Eventually she helps the pair to flee Sufugnoff and escape the clutches of the United Mankind. For her assistance, as well as the legal requirement for ship owners to be ranking Abh nobles, she is raised to the rank of an Abh dame/equestrian (reucec). 

 Min Kulsup
 A member of Marca's anti-imperialist group. He is also a previous member of the Independence Party which he left three years prior to the occupation of United Mankind. He is skillful in the production of arms a lot of which were alleged to have been found in his villa. Because of his history and line of work, he is suspected of possibly aiding the empire. Like Marca, he too became an Abh knight/equestrian at the end of Seikai no Monshō with the rest of Marca's group. 

 "The Undertaker"
 The owner of the Clasbul funeral facility which was used to send Jinto and Lafiel back to space. His favorite story is about a guy who jumped unto thorn bushes. He too became an Abh knight/equestrian as a reward for aiding their escape. 

 Daswani
 A big and silent man who is a member of Marca's anti-empirialist group. He too became an Abh knight/equestrian at the end of Seikai no Monshō with the rest of Marca's group. 

 Bill
 Nicknamed "the Speeder," he is another member of Marcas's anti-empirialist group. He too became an Abh knight/equestrian at the end of Seikai no Monshō with the rest of Marca's group.

References
 Seikai Trilogy, vol. 1: Crest of the Stars (manga), Tokyopop, June 2004. 
 Seikai Trilogy, vol. 2: Banner of the Stars (manga), Tokyopop, Aug. 2004. 
 Seikai Trilogy, vol. 3: Banner of the Stars II (manga), Tokyopop, Oct. 2004. 
 Morioka, Hiroyuki. Crest of the Stars, vol. 1: Princess of the Empire (trans. Sue Shambaugh; novel), Tokyopop, 2006. 
 Morioka, Hiroyuki. Crest of the Stars, vol. 2: A Modest War (trans. Sue Shambaugh; novel), Tokyopop, 2007. 

Seikai
Seikai
Seikai
Characters